Guerrilla is a 1985 Indian Malayalam film,  directed by K. S. Gopalakrishnan. The film had musical score by K. J. Joy.

Cast

Gureilla Unni

Prameela

Bheeman Raghu

K.P Ummer

Kaviyoor Ponnamma

Soundtrack
The music was composed by K. J. Joy and the lyrics were written by Bharanikkavu Sivakumar.

References

External links
 

1985 films
1980s Malayalam-language films